Blackfriars, also known as London Blackfriars, is a central London railway station and connected London Underground station in the City of London. It provides Thameslink services: local (from North to South London), and regional (Bedford and Cambridge to Brighton) and limited Southeastern commuter services to South East London and Kent. Its platforms span the River Thames, the only one in London to do so, along the length of Blackfriars Railway Bridge, a short distance downstream from Blackfriars Bridge. There are two station entrances either side of the Thames, along with a connection to the London Underground District and Circle lines.

The main line station was opened by the London, Chatham and Dover Railway with the name St. Paul's in 1886, as a replacement for the earlier Blackfriars Bridge station (now the present station's southern entrance) and the earlier Blackfriars railway bridge. This increased capacity of rail traffic through the Snow Hill tunnel to the rest of the rail network. The Underground station opened in 1870 with the arrival of the Metropolitan District Railway. The station was renamed Blackfriars in 1937 to avoid confusion with St Paul's tube station. It was rebuilt in the 1970s, which included the addition of office space above the station and the closure of the original railway bridge, which was demolished in 1985.

In 2009, the station underwent major refurbishments to improve capacity, which included the extension of the platforms across the railway bridge and a new station entrance on the South Bank. The underground station was rebuilt at the same time, and work was completed in 2012.

Location 
Blackfriars station serves Thameslink rail services that connect suburbs with central London. It straddles the River Thames, running across the length of Blackfriars Railway Bridge parallel to the A201 Blackfriars Bridge. For this reason, it is partly in the City of London and partly in the London Borough of Southwark. The north bank entrance is on the south side of Queen Victoria Street and the south bank entrance, opened in 2011, is adjacent to Blackfriars Road.

The station falls within fare zone 1. The station is run by Thameslink, with Transport for London handling the underground platforms. A Thameslink driver depot is in the station building. London Buses routes 4, 40, 63 and night routes N63 and N89 serve the station. The adjacent Blackfriars Millennium Pier provides river services to Putney and Canary Wharf.

History

London, Chatham and Dover Railway 

The station was proposed by the London, Chatham and Dover Railway (LC&DR), who had been given parliamentary power to build a line into the City of London. The company wanted to compete with rivals, the South Eastern Railway, and provide the best service into Central London. The line was complete as far as the Thames by 1864; the LC&DR opened Blackfriars Bridge station on 1 June, which sat on the south bank adjacent to Blackfriars Road. The station was constructed on two levels, with a goods depot at street level and passenger facilities level with the bridge. An underground station at Blackfriars north of the river was opened by the Metropolitan District Railway in 1870, before any mainline stations.

The railway bridge across the Thames was delayed because the City's controlling government, the Corporation of London, were unsure as to what it should look like and how many arches there should be. The station was designed by Joseph Cubitt and had a long roof with walls that stretched up to the riverbank. Cubitt subsequently designed the original bridge, which carried four tracks on a  lattice girder bridge, supported by sets of stone piers supporting iron columns. Services began across the bridge on 21 December 1864. A further station, opened on 2 March 1874 and the LC&DR line ran via the Snow Hill tunnel to a connection to the Metropolitan Railway near , then on to King's Cross and  stations.

The mainline Blackfriars station was opened by the LC&DR as St. Paul's railway station on 10 May 1886 when the company opened the St. Paul's Railway Bridge across the Thames. It widened past the bridge to the terminus on the south side of Queen Victoria Street. The original station was a small and cheaply designed pink-red brick building, as the LD&CR had financial difficulties throughout its lifetime attempting to drive a railway through Central London. The station's frontage backed onto the District Railway, making a cab access and forecourt impossible owing to lack of space. It did, however, allow St Paul's a direct interchange with the rest of the underground, unlike all the other LC&DR stations. On 13 November 1886, a direct connection was made between the mainline and underground stations.

After the opening of St. Paul's station, the earlier Blackfriars Bridge station was closed to passengers but remained as a goods station until 1965. Most mainline trains called at St Paul's, including those stopping at Holborn Viaduct. Local commuters continued to use Ludgate Hill where possible, as it was closer to where they were going, but it did not have sufficient capacity.

Southern Railway and Southern Region 

St. Paul's station was renamed by the Southern Railway as Blackfriars on 1 February 1937. This was partly done to avoid confusion after the London Passenger Transport Board renamed Post Office tube station on the Central line to St Paul's, and partly so that the mainline and underground stations would have the same name. It suffered significant bomb damage during World War II. Overnight on 16–17 April 1941, the signalbox on the south side of the bridge was destroyed, along with a bridge over Southwark Street. The signals were not fully restored until 11 August 1946, after the war.

After the creation of British Railways in 1948, the station was managed by the Southern Region. Gradually, the structure of the original Blackfriars Railway Bridge deteriorated until it was unsound. In 1961, two tracks were removed from the bridge to ease its load. The station had little investment and still supported some of the original architecture and design up to the 1960s. By this time, services were reduced to a handful of commuter services. The original Blackfriars Bridge station, which had remained as a good depot, was demolished in 1964. The bridge was closed to trains on 27 June 1971 and the deck was removed in 1985, and only the piers in the river and the orange bridge abutments remain.

The station began to be rebuilt along with the Underground station in 1971, which included an additional  of office space. Reconstruction was problematic, as the original station building had sat on top of a cold store, which had frozen the ground below it. The District line tunnel had to be removed and replaced with a new supporting structure that could accommodate the redesigned station building. The work was formally reopened on 30 November 1977 by the Lord Mayor of London, Peter Vanneck (though the station had never actually closed). A part of the stonework elevation from the 1886 LC&DR station has been preserved at platform level in the main line station indicating many destinations in the south-east of England and in Europe.

Station rebuild 

Blackfriars station was significantly renovated between 2009 and 2012 in a £500 million redevelopment programme to modernise the station and increase capacity. The terminal platforms at the station were closed on 20 March 2009 in order for work to begin. The original concept for the project was designed by Pascall+Watson architects, with execution by Jacobs and Tony Gee and Partners; it was built by Balfour Beatty. The office building above the station was demolished and replaced as part of the Thameslink programme. The new station is the same height and has a combined National Rail and London Underground ticket hall and ventilation shaft together with escalators and lifts between a mezzanine level for main line railway services and the sub-surface level for London Underground services. The Underground station also received major enhancements, with a new roof of glazed north lights and partial-height glazed side panels installed along the entire length of the bridge.

On the south bank of the river a new station entrance was built at Bankside, containing a second ticket hall. The through platforms were moved to the east side and extended along Blackfriars Railway Bridge to accommodate 12-carriage trains (in place of the previous eight). The layout has been altered by building new bay platforms on the west side, avoiding the need for through trains between City Thameslink and London Bridge crossing the paths of terminating ones.

The works exploited the disused piers west of the existing railway bridge which once supported the former West Blackfriars and St. Paul's Railway Bridge. The easternmost row of disused piers was strengthened, tied into the existing bridge and clad in stone. The longer platforms allow longer trains on the Thameslink route to pass through London. Thameslink services began using the newly constructed platforms in early 2011. The station's new entrance and ticket hall on the south side of the river opened on 5 December. The tube station reopened on 20 February 2012. The Mayor of London, Boris Johnson, visited the works on the same day, saying "the rebirth of this central London station will improve the journeys of thousands of passengers every single day". The reconstruction work provided jobs for around 13,000 people, with a peak of 2,000 per day at the busiest times. The Thameslink redevelopment work at Blackfriars has been well received. In January 2014 the Blackfriars Railway Bridge became the world's largest solar-powered bridge having been covered with 4,400 photovoltaic panels providing up to half of the energy for the station. In 2017, the station won a Major Station of the Year award at the National Rail Awards.

The Department for Transport considers this to have "no significant transport benefit".

Accidents 
On 19 May 1938, a SECR B1 class locomotive was derailed, causing several hours disruption at the station.
On 2 January 2014, a train's pantograph struck the roof of the station due to a technical fault.

Services 

Blackfriars main-line station is served by through services on the Thameslink route operated by Thameslink and Southeastern. Before March 2009 some services from the south terminated at three bay platforms, which were then removed during renovation works. Two new bay platforms opened in May 2012 and are used during peak hours and at weekends. Southeastern provides direct services to Kent during peak hours Monday to Friday.

The typical off-peak service in trains per hour is:
 4 tph to  via 
 2 tph to  via  and Gatwick Airport
 2 tph to Three Bridges via Redhill
 2 tph to  via  and 
 2 tph to  via 
 2 tph to  via Stevenage

The station is also served by a small number of Southeastern services to Beckenham Junction and Dartford.

Although many services are Thameslink through trains, Blackfriars is considered a central London terminus and tickets marked 'London Terminals' are valid to use when travelling to/from the south. Tickets marked 'London Thameslink' can be used in both directions.

Blackfriars Underground station 

The underground station pre-dates the mainline one and was opened on 30 May 1870 by the Metropolitan District Railway (MDR) as the railway's new eastern terminus when the line was extended from Westminster. The MDR had been created as a new company to complete the Circle line, which would split the budget from the District and Metropolitan Railways. The construction of the new section of the MDR was planned in conjunction with the building of the Victoria Embankment and was achieved by the cut and cover method of roofing over a shallow trench. On 3 July 1871 the MDR was extended eastwards to a new terminus at Mansion House. The Circle line ran over the same route, but its completion was delayed following arguments between the District and Metropolitan Railways and did not open until 6 October 1884.

The underground station was closed on 2 March 2009 for major renovation work and reopened on 20 February 2012. This involved demolishing the National Rail building and merging its ticket hall with the Underground's.

References 
Notes

Citations

Sources

External links 

 London Transport Museum Photographic Archive

 Disused stations – Blackfriars station
 Blackfriars and the City Line

Circle line (London Underground) stations
District line stations
Tube stations in the City of London
Richard Seifert buildings
Former Metropolitan District Railway stations
Railway stations in Great Britain opened in 1870
Railway termini in London
Railway stations in the City of London
Former London, Chatham and Dover Railway stations
Railway stations in Great Britain opened in 1886
Railway stations served by Govia Thameslink Railway
Railway stations served by Southeastern
Station
Train driver depots in England
London station group